A tundra tire (UK: tundra tyre) is a large low-pressure tire used on light aircraft to allow operations on rough terrain.

A common variant of tundra tire is the bushwheel brand. These tires include an integral inner tube with the valve manufactured into the side-wall, allowing the tire to operate at very low pressures without risking shearing-off the valve stem and causing a flat tire. Low-pressure tires provide greater cushioning and enable aircraft to land on rough surfaces, unsuitable for normal tires. Bushwheels are a common modification for backcountry aircraft.

History
The tundra-style tire has been independently invented at different times and places. It was initially offered by Goodyear in fully inflated diameters up to 46 inches (117 cm), with a thirty-inch (76 cm) diameter in Goodyear's lineup having similar dimensions as seen in the British Flight magazine announcement, to a currently available size of tundra tire.

Nearly twenty years after the original Musselman design appeared on the market, Phipps designed and constructed his own balloon tires in the period after the Second World War and fitted them to a Piper PA-18 Super Cub. Phipps then went on to provide air transportation to much of the Canadian high arctic region. He later established his own airline, Atlas Aviation, which operated a fleet of De Havilland Canada DHC-6 Twin Otters on balloon tires. Using the tires, Atlas's DHC-6s established airline service to such remote communities as Resolute, Nunavut and Grise Fiord, Nunavut.

Airworthiness issues 
In the United States and particularly in Alaska, tundra tires of various designs were often installed under local field approvals by Federal Aviation Administration inspectors. These approvals were usually granted on the basis of visual inspections and did not include flight testing. After a number of accidents with aircraft equipped with tundra tires, culminating with a large number in the fall of 1994, the National Transportation Safety Board identified that the tundra tires were connected with the accidents. Starting in April 1995 the FAA carried out flight test experiments to determine whether the tundra tires were a contributing factor.

The tests used a Piper PA-18-150 Super Cub equipped in sequence with five different sets of tires, including standard factory tires and tundra tires up to  diameter. The PA-18 was operated at different weights and center-of-gravity positions.

The testing on the ground revealed that the larger the tire, the more restricted the forward visibility on the ground, that there was a nose-down pitching moment when the tires contacted the ground on landing, particularly on a wheel landing, and that tundra tire-equipped aircraft have substantially poorer ground handling characteristics on pavement. In the air, the use of tundra tires reduced top speed, rate of climb, angle of climb, range, useful load and stall warning buffet margins.

The tests did not indicate that tundra tires raise stall speed, but did find that, due to increased drag in turns, the aircraft's nose tends to drop excessively with an increase in bank angle. If the pilot counteracts this tendency with rudder and stalls the aircraft, the airplane will rapidly enter a spin.

Alaska bush pilots disputed the experimental findings, but, as a result of these experiments the FAA required that all installed tires be subject to a Technical Standard Order or Parts Manufacturer Approval, have been flight-tested and subject to a weight and balance report, determining an acceptable flight envelope.

Operators
Until the end of the 20th century tundra tires were mostly used by bush operators flying in remote areas. In the early part of the 21st century many sales of tundra tires have been to recreational pilots. Bill Duncan, president of Alaskan Bushwheels a tundra tire manufacturer explains:

Charles McDowell, an Aviat Husky pilot stated:

References

External links
 Old Rhinebeck Aerodrome's Great Lakes 2T-1MS biplane and Curtiss-Wright CW-1 Junior monoplane, both fitted with original Musselman/Goodyear "air wheel" precursors to tundra tires.(Archived files from October 20, 2014)

Tires
Aircraft undercarriage